Francis Myburg (20 July 1871 – 30 November 1929) was a South African international rugby union player who played as a halfback.

He made 1 appearance for South Africa against the British Lions in 1896.

References

South African rugby union players
South Africa international rugby union players
1871 births
1929 deaths
Rugby union players from Cape Town
Rugby union halfbacks
Western Province (rugby union) players